Noemí Laserre (died April 7, 2001) was an Argentine actress.

References

2001 deaths
Argentine actresses
Burials at La Chacarita Cemetery